Longitarsus inconspicuus is a species of beetle in the subfamily Galerucinae that is endemic to the Canary Islands.

References

I
Beetles described in 1860
Endemic fauna of the Canary Islands
Taxa named by Thomas Vernon Wollaston